The British University in Dubai (BUiD) is a research-based non-profit institution in Dubai, United Arab Emirates. Founded in 2003 by the country's Vice President and Prime Minister Maktoum bin Rashid al-Maktoum, it is licensed by the UAE's  Ministry of Education's Higher Education Affairs and all its programmes are accredited by the Commission for Academic Accreditation (CAA).

BUiD is part of a strategic alliance with three UK Russell Group universities: University of Edinburgh, the University of Manchester, and University of Glasgow.

BUiD is located in Dubai International Academic City, Dubai.

Overview
The original idea for the university had emanated from the Dubai-UK Trade and Economic Committee (DUKTEC), which comprised nominees of the Government of Dubai and the Government of the United Kingdom. It was first thought that a British university would assist with the recruitment and retention of British expatriate workers, but a subsequent survey was inconclusive on this point, there being a good range of undergraduate provision in the emirate already and many undergraduates preferring to study away from home. Further, discussions intensified the opportunity for a research-based university to make a more substantial contribution to Dubai's development aspirations.

BUiD was established as a not-for-profit institution. The University was established by Law #5/2003
by His Highness Sheikh Maktoum bin Rashid bin Saeed Al Maktoum, Ruler of Dubai Its founders are Al Maktoum Foundation, Dubai Development and Investment Authority (now Dubai Holding), the National Bank of Dubai (now Emirates NBD), the British Business Group, and Rolls-Royce.

BUiD works in collaboration with leading organisations and institutions including its major
contributing partner Atkins, Knowledge Fund Establishment, and the UAE Ministry of Education, and government and associated bodies across the UAE’s public and private sectors.

Programmes
Bachelors Programmes:
 Bachelor of Law
 Bachelor of Science in Accounting & Finance
 Bachelor of Science in Business Management
 Bachelor of Science in Electro-Mechanical Engineering
 Bachelor of Science in Computer Science (Artificial Intelligence)
 Bachelor of Science in Computer Science (Software Engineering)

Masters Programmes:

 Master of Education
 Master of Education in Management Leadership and Policy
 Master of Education in Special and Inclusive Education
 Master of Education in Teaching English to Speakers of Other Languages (TESOL)
 Master of Education in Information and Communication Technology
 Master of Education in Science Education
 Master of Education in Psychology (PSYCH)
 Master of Education in Learning and Teaching
 Master of Business Administration (MBA) (General/Finance/Human Resource Management/Marketing/Sustainability)
 Portfolio of Masters Programmes in Project Management (Project Management/Construction Project Management/Enterprise Project Risk Management/IT Project Management/Infrastructure Project Management)
 Master of Architecture
 Master of Science in Construction Law and Dispute Resolution
 Master of Science in Engineering Management (Energy Management/ Maintenance and Reliability/Total Quality Management)
 Master of Science in Structural Engineering
 Master of Science in Informatics (Knowledge and Data Management)
 Master of Science in Information Technology Management (Business Intelligence/ e-Business Intelligence)
 Master of Science in Sustainable Design of the Built Environment (Architectural Design/Interior Design/Smart Buildings/Urban Design)

PhD Programmes:

 Doctor of Education and PhD in Education
 Professional Doctorate in Business Administration (DBA)
 PhD in Business Management
 PhD in Project Management
 PhD in Architecture and Sustainable Built Environment
 PhD in Computer Science
 PhD in Business Law

Scholarships Programmes
 Undergraduate Scholarships
 Postgraduate Scholarships

References

External links
 British University in Dubai

Educational institutions established in 2004
Universities and colleges in Dubai
2004 establishments in the United Arab Emirates
Dubai Knowledge Village
Dubai International Academic City